The Small Millionaire (translit. Al-Millionairah al-Saghirah) is an Egyptian 1948 drama film directed and written by Kamal Barakat. It stars Rushdy Abaza and Faten Hamama.

Plot 

A beautiful, young lady falls in love with a pilot officer and wants to marry him, but her grandmother, of a Turkish aristocratic family, doesn't concur and would not allow her to marry the man. One of the family members tries to convince the grandmother to accept this. The grandmother dies and the woman inherits some of her wealth. Her lover becomes hesitant towards their marriage, thinking everybody might assume he married her for her wealth. She convinces him that this is not true and trusts him and loves him, so they marry each other.

Cast 
Faten Hamama as the young woman.
Rushdy Abaza as the pilot officer.
Mary Munib
Fouad Shafiq

References 
Film summary, Faten Hamama's official site. Retrieved on 27 December 2006.

External links 
 

1948 films
1940s Arabic-language films
1948 drama films
Egyptian drama films
Egyptian black-and-white films